The St. Mary's Cathedral  also called Catholic Cathedral of Kimberley Is the name given to a religious building affiliated with the  Roman Catholic Church which is located in 72 Du Toitspan of the city of Kimberley in the Northern Cape Province, part of the African country of South Africa. It is dedicated to the Virgin Mary whom Christians believe is the Mother of God.

The Cathedral follows the Roman or Latin rite and is the mother church of the Diocese of Kimberley (Dioecesis Kimberleyensis) which was created as apostolic vicariate in 1886 and was elevated to its current status in 1951 through the bull "Supreme Nobis" of Pope Pius XII.

It is under the pastoral responsibility of Bishop Abel Gabuza.

See also
List of cathedrals in South Africa#Roman Catholic
Roman Catholicism in South Africa
St. Mary's Cathedral, Cape Town

References

Roman Catholic cathedrals in South Africa
Churches in Kimberley, Northern Cape